Ghilino Ghilini or Guglielmo de Guillini or Ghilino Ghillini (died 1559) was a Roman Catholic prelate who served as Bishop of Comacchio (1514–1559).

Biography
On 1 September 1514, Ghilino Ghilini was appointed during the papacy of Pope Leo X as Bishop of Comacchio.
He served as Bishop of Comacchio until his death on 21 December 1559.

While bishop, he was the principal co-consecrator of Lattanzio Roverella, Bishop of Ascoli Piceno (1551).

References

External links and additional sources
 (for Chronology of Bishops) 
 (for Chronology of Bishops) 

16th-century Italian Roman Catholic bishops
Bishops appointed by Pope Leo X
1559 deaths